Danny O'Brien may refer to:

Danny O'Brien (Australian rules footballer) (born 1980), former Australian rules footballer
Danny O'Brien (boxer) (1939–2001), Irish Olympic boxer
Danny O'Brien (gridiron football) (born 1990), American football quarterback
Danny O'Brien (journalist) (born 1969), British technology journalist and civil liberties activist
Danny O'Brien (politician) (born 1974), Australian politician and Member of the Victorian Legislative Council
Danny O'Brien, character in The Affairs of Martha
Danny O'Brien (footballer, born 1996), English footballer for Finnish side SJK

See also
Daniel O'Brien (disambiguation)